Raqqa campaign may refer to:
 Raqqa campaign (2012–13), battles between various Syrian rebel groups and Syrian government
 Raqqa campaign (2016–17), battles between the Syrian Democratic Forces (SDF) and the Islamic State of Iraq and the Levant (ISIL)